The Aylwin class was a class of four destroyers in the United States Navy; all served as convoy escorts during World War I. The Aylwins were the second of five "second-generation" 1000-ton four-stack destroyer classes that were front-line ships of the Navy until the 1920s. They were known as "thousand tonners". All were scrapped in 1935 to comply with the London Naval Treaty.

All four ships were built by William Cramp & Sons in Philadelphia.

In design and armament they were essentially repeats of the Cassin class.

Design
Unlike the other "thousand tonner" classes, the Aylwins were not a significant improvement on the previous class.

Armament
They retained the Cassins' armament of four /50 caliber Mark 9 guns and eight 18-inch (450 mm) torpedo tubes in twin broadside mounts. Compared with the previous  of the "flivver" type, the increased gun armament reflected the increasing size of foreign destroyers they might have to fight. The broadside (two twin mounts each side) torpedo armament reflected the General Board's desire to have some torpedoes remaining after firing a broadside. The class was probably equipped with one or two depth charge racks each for anti-submarine convoy escort missions in World War I. Benham was equipped with four twin 4-inch mounts in 1917, but these were replaced with single mounts before she deployed overseas. By 1929 all except Parker had a /23 caliber anti-aircraft gun added.

Engineering
Compound steam engines could be clutched to the shafts for economical medium-speed cruising. Normal fuel oil capacity was 307 tons.

Ships in class

See also

References

Bibliography

External links
Tin Can Sailors @ Destroyers.org - Aylwin-class destroyer
DestroyerHistory.org Aylwin class page
DestroyerHistory.org Thousand Tonner page
NavSource Destroyer Photo Index Page
DiGiulian, Tony Navweaps.com 4"/50 Mks 7, 8, 9, and 10
DiGiulian, Tony Navweaps.com Pre-WWII US Torpedoes
US Navy Torpedo History, part 2 

 
Destroyer classes